is a railway station in the town of Iide, Yamagata Prefecture, Japan, operated by East Japan Railway Company (JR East).

Lines
Uzen-Tsubaki Station is served by the Yonesaka Line, and is located 30.1 rail kilometers from the terminus of the line at Yonezawa Station.

Station layout
The station has two opposed side platforms connected to the station building by a footbridge. The station is staffed.

Platforms

History
Uzen-Tsubaki Station opened on August 10, 1931. The station was absorbed into the JR East network upon the privatization of JNR on April 1, 1987. The current station building dates from December 1995.

Passenger statistics
In fiscal 2018, the station was used by an average of 25 passengers daily (boarding passengers only),

Surrounding area

See also
List of Railway Stations in Japan

References

External links

  JR East Station information 

Railway stations in Yamagata Prefecture
Yonesaka Line
Railway stations in Japan opened in 1931
Stations of East Japan Railway Company
Iide, Yamagata